Japanese football in 1921.

Emperor's Cup

Births
December 6 - Nobuo Matsunaga

External links

 
Seasons in Japanese football